The 2002 Speedway Grand Prix Qualification or GP Challenge was a series of motorcycle speedway meetings used to determine the 12 riders that would qualify for the 2002 Speedway Grand Prix to join the other 10 riders that finished in the leading positions from the 2001 Speedway Grand Prix.

The format changed significantly, in that only 6 riders would qualify through the GP Challenge. The other six places would go to riders seeded through - Rune Holta, Matej Ferjan, Andreas Jonsson, Grzegorz Walasek, Sebastian Ułamek and Krzysztof Cegielski.

Greg Hancock won the GP Challenge.

Format
 First Round - 5 riders from Sweden, 5 from Denmark, 3 from Norway, 3 from Finland to Scandinavian Final
 First Round - 32 riders from Continental quarter finals to Continental semi-finals
 First Round - 6 riders from British Final to Overseas Final
 First Round - 5 riders from Australian Final to Overseas Final
 First Round - 1 rider from Canadian Final to Overseas Final
 First Round - 4 riders from United States Final to Overseas Final
 Second Round - 8 riders from Scandinavian Final to Intercontinental Final
 Second Round - 8 riders from Overseas Final to Intercontinental Final
 Second Round - 16 riders from Continental semi-finals to Continental Final
 Third Round - 9 riders (outside the top 10) from the 2001 Grand Prix & World U21 champion to GP Challenge
 Third Round - 5 riders from the Continental Final to GP Challenge
 Third Round - 9 riders from the Intercontinental Final to GP Challenge
 Final Round - 6 riders from the GP Challenge to the 2002 Grand Prix

First round

Continental quarter finals

Second round

Overseas Final
 8 riders to Intercontinental Final

Scandinavian Final
8 riders to Intercontinental Final

Continental semi finals

Third round
9 riders (outside the top 10) from the 2001 Grand Prix & World U21 champion to GP Challenge

Intercontinental Final
 9 riders to GP Challenge

Continental Final 
5 riders to GP Challenge
12 August 2001  Gdańsk

Final Round

GP Challenge
6 riders to 2002 Grand Prix
13 October 2001  Krško

References 

Speedway Grand Prix Qualification
Speedway Grand Prix Qualifications